The Mongolian nobility (yazgurtan;  survaljtan) arose between the 10th and 12th centuries, became prominent in the 13th century, and essentially governed Mongolia until the early 20th century.

The Mongolian word for nobility, Yazgurtan, derives from the Mongol word yazgur, meaning "root".

Mongol Empire (1206–1368) and Yuan dynasty (1271–1368)

Nobility titles
 Khaan (Khagan), the supreme ruler of the Mongol Empire.
 Noyon, meaning "King of a State", a ruler of a vassal/tributary state under the Mongol Empire.
 Jonon, meaning "Crown Prince", the heir apparent of the Great Khaan. During the Yuan dynasty, the Jonon resided in Kharakhorum and administered ceremonial events.
 Khan Khuu, meaning "Prince".
 Mirza , a Persian term meaning "Prince".

Military ranks
 Tumetu-iin Noyan, meaning "Commander of a Tümen". A tümen was a military unit of 10,000 troops. There were initially only nine tümens in the Mongol Empire in 1206, but by 1368 there were 40 Mongol tümens and four Oirat tümens.
 Mingghan-u Noyan , meaning "Commander of a Mingghan". A mingghan was a military unit of 1,000 troops.
 Jagutu-iin Darga , meaning "Commander of a Zuut". A zuut was a military unit of 100 troops.
 Arban-u Darga , meaning "Commander of an Aravt". An aravt was a military unit of 10 troops.
 Cherbi, a title for a Kheshig commander.
 Beg , a Turkic term meaning "Chieftain".

Female titles
 Khatun (可敦), meaning "Empress" or "Queen".
 Begum or Behi (别姬), referred to a noble lady, a Turkic term used to refer to the wife or daughter of a bey. 
 Gonji (公主), referred to a princess or noble lady.

Northern Yuan dynasty (1368–1635)

Nobility titles 
 Khaan (Khagan), the supreme ruler of the Northern Yuan Empire.
 Khan, a title for a Mongol feudal lord. By the mid-16th century, there were a number of khans in Mongolia as local feudal lords started calling themselves khan. Note that this khan is different from khaan; khaan was reserved for the supreme ruler only.
 Jinong (the crown prince or heir apparent of the Khaan. He resided in the Inner Mongolia region. From the 15th century, the title became a hereditary one and was no longer reserved exclusively for the heir apparent of the Khaan.
 Khong Tayiji (originated from the Chinese term huangtaizi (皇太子; "Imperial Crown Prince"). It was used to refer to a descendant of Genghis Khan who had his own fief.
 Taiji, a title for a descendant of Genghis Khan.
 Wang, a title for a descendant of Qasar or any of Genghis Khan's brothers who had his own fief.
 Taishi (Grand Preceptor), a title for a noble of non-Borjigit descent who had his own fief. Such nobles included the descendants of Tumetu-iin Noyans.

Female titles
 Taihu, the Khaans consort.
 Khatun , referred to a queen consort or noble lady of equivalent status.
 Gonji, referred to a princess or noble lady of equivalent status.
 Behichi (Beiji), referred to a princess consort or noble lady of equivalent status.

Qing dynasty (1691–1911) and Bogd Khaganate (1911–1924)

Nobility titles
 Khan (Хан), referred to the lord of a hoshun. Note that this title is of a lower status than the Khaan or Khagan used in earlier times. Among the Khalkha Mongols, there were four khans: Tushietu Khan, Zasagtu Khan, Secen Khan and Sain Noyan Khan. In the Kobdo region, there were two khans: Tögs Hülüg Dalai Khan and Ünen Zorigtu Khan. Despite the association of the four aimags with these titles, the khans power was restricted to only within his hoshun. The khan would communicate with the Qing Emperor just as any other Jasagh (hoshun lord).
 Ashan-i hafan (男爵; equivalent of baron), a special title awarded to foreigners (e.g. Alexander Zanzer I) during the reign of Bogd Khan. The baron drew an annual income of 3,500 taels of silver and 60 rolls of silk.

The following six titles were the same as those used by members of the Manchu nobility. (See here for details.) These titles were usually hereditary, and were decorated with styles to form a longer title (e.g. Khorchin Jasagh Darhan Chin-Wang 科爾沁扎薩克達爾罕親王) to indicate which hoshun the noble was from.
 Chin Wang ( 親王), referred to the lord of a hoshun. A chin wang drew an annual income of 2,600 taels of silver and 40 rolls of silk, and owned 60 slaves.
 Giyün Wang ( 郡王), referred to the lord of a hoshun. A giyün wang drew an annual income of 1,200–2,000 taels of silver and 15–25 rolls of silk, and owned 50 slaves.
 Beile ( 貝勒), referred to the lord of a hoshun. A beile drew an annual income of 600 taels of silver and 13 rolls of silk, and owned 40 slaves.
 Beis ( 貝子), referred to the lord of a hoshun. A beis drew an annual income of 500 taels of silver and 10 rolls of silk.
 Tushiye Gong ( 鎮國公), referred to the lord of a hoshun. A tushiye gong drew an annual income of 300 taels of silver and nine rolls of silk.
 Tusalagchi Gong ( 輔國公), referred to the lord of a hoshun. A tusalagchi gong drew an annual income of 200 taels of silver and seven rolls of silk.
 Hohi Taiji ( 台吉) referred to a Mongol noble who did not hold any of the above six titles. It was subdivided into four ranks:
 Terigun Zereg-un Taiji (一等台吉), first-rank hohi taiji who was eligible for a hereditary lordship over a hoshun. He drew an annual income of 100 taels of silver and four rolls of silk.
 Ded Zereg-un Taiji (二等台吉), second-rank hohi taiji who was also eligible for a hereditary lordship over a hoshun. He drew an annual income of 90 taels of silver and three rolls of silk.
 Gutagaar Zereg-un Taiji (三等台吉), third-rank hohi taiji.
 Dötugeer Zereg-un Taiji (四等台吉), fourth-rank hohi taiji who drew an annual income of 40 taels of silver and owned four slaves.

Generic titles
Apart from the above ranks, the nobles were also divided into two types:
 Töröl Taiji (literally "related nobles"), members of the 'Altan Urug' and descendants of Genghis Khan.
 Khariyatu Taiji (literally "subject nobles"), descendants of Qasar, Belgutei and Genghis Khan's brothers, or of Tooril Khan and Tumetu-iin Noyans.

Other titles used to refer to Mongolian nobles include:
 A-ge ( 阿哥), a son of a noble family.
 Tabunang ( 塔布囊), a son-in-law of a noble family.

Non-noble titles
 Soumon Albatu (сумын албат), referred to a slave in general
 Hamjilga (хамжлага), referred to a slave of a noble family
 Shabi (шавь), referred to a servant of a hotogtu (呼圖克圖; a title awarded by the Dalai Lama or Panchen Lama)

See also
 History of Mongolia
 List of Mongol states
 Royal and noble ranks of the Qing dynasty
 Timeline of Mongolian history

 
Social history of Mongolia
Asian nobility